Diego Matamoros is a Canadian actor who has performed in theatre, television, film, radio, and voice animation, both across Canada and in the United States. In 1998, he won a Gemini award for his performance as Dr. Goldman in CBC Television's miniseries, The Sleep Room. Other film credits include: "Montreal Vu Par" directed by Denis Arcand (1990) and the film adaptation of Anne Michael's award-winning novel, Fugitive Pieces, directed by Jeremy Podeswa (2007). In 1998 he co-founded the Soulpepper Theatre Company with 11 other actors and has, since then, appeared in every season with the company, with more than 70 roles over 22 seasons. In 2006, he co-founded and taught Soulpepper's advanced actors' year-round training program: The Soulpepper Academy. He has taught and directed at the National Theatre School of Canada, Ryerson University, George Brown Theatre School, and the University of Toronto. He had also received the Dora Mavor Moore Award multiple times for his stage performances, which include The Fool in "King Lear" (2006), Clov in "Endgame" (1999 and 2015), the title role in "Uncle Vanya" (2000, 2001 and 2008), George in "Who's Afraid of Virginia Woolf" (2014) and Roy Cohn in "Angels in America" (2013 and 2014). He also co-created and performed two original works for the company: "The Aleph" (2012) and "Cage" (2017), which was also performed as part of Soulpepper's summer residency at the Signature Theatre, 55th Street, in New York City.  He was also known for voicing Cluny the Scourge and Badrang the Tyrant in Redwall.

Filmography

References

External links

20th-century Canadian male actors
21st-century Canadian male actors
Best Supporting Actor in a Television Film or Miniseries Canadian Screen Award winners
Canadian male film actors
Canadian male television actors
Canadian male voice actors
Canadian male stage actors
Brazilian emigrants to Canada
Canadian people of Brazilian descent
Male actors from Rio de Janeiro (city)
Living people
Year of birth missing (living people)